Iddo Netanyahu (born July 24, 1952) is an Israeli physician, author, and playwright. He is the younger brother of Benjamin Netanyahu, the Prime Minister of Israel, and Yonatan Netanyahu, a highly decorated soldier who was killed leading Operation Entebbe, the hostage rescue mission in 1976.

Biography
Iddo Netanyahu was born in Jerusalem, the son of Cela (née Segal; 1912–2000) and professor Benzion Netanyahu (1910–2012), and spent part of his childhood in the United States. He left studies at Cornell University in 1973 to fight for Israel in the Yom Kippur War.

Netanyahu served in Sayeret Matkal from 1970 to 1973, Israel's special forces unit, as did both his brothers. He has an M.D. from Hebrew University of Jerusalem School of Medicine and did post-doctoral training at Georgetown University Hospital, Washington, D.C., and Mount Sinai Medical Center, New York City. He works part-time as a radiologist, but dedicates most of his time to writing.

Since 2008, after authoring several books, Netanyahu has been concentrating on playwriting. His plays have appeared worldwide, including off-Broadway in New York, Tel Aviv, St. Petersburg, Moscow, and Tashkent, among other cities. His play Don Samuel Abravanel was awarded the President of Warsaw Prize in 2022.

Personal life
Netanyahu lives in Jerusalem, Israel. He is married and has two children.

Published works
The Rescuers – published in Hebrew, a collection of short stories.
Yoni's Last Battle: The Rescue at Entebbe, 1976 (2002) – Later re-released as Entebbe: A Defining Moment On The War On Terrorism – The Jonathan Netanyahu Story, published in Hebrew, English, Russian, Chinese, and Italian.
Itamar K. – published in Hebrew, Russian and Italian, a novel about music and life, ironic and poetic.
Sayeret Matkal at Entebbe – published in Hebrew, documents, and interviews about the raid.
A Happy End – published in Italian, drama, with the title "Un Lieto Fine," and in English by Playscripts, Inc.

Plays
A Happy End - a Jewish family living in Berlin, contemplating the meaning and consequences of the recent rise of the Nazis.
Worlds In Collision - a battle of the minds between Albert Einstein and Immanuel Velikovsky.
Meaning - the relationship between the renowned psychiatrist Viktor Frankl and a patient of his, against the backdrop of the Holocaust.
The Muse - a comedy about today's intellectual and artistic trends.
Myth - the attempts of a widow to fight the falsifications about her late husband.
Don Samuel Abravanel - the legalistic murder of a Jewish leader in Medieval Spain and its consequences.

References

1952 births
Living people
Cornell University alumni
The Hebrew University-Hadassah Medical School alumni
Israeli expatriates in the United States
Israeli Ashkenazi Jews
Israeli people of Lithuanian-Jewish descent
Israeli people of Polish-Jewish descent
Israeli people of the Yom Kippur War
Jewish military personnel
Jewish physicians
Iddo
People from Jerusalem
Israeli radiologists